"Lenny" is a song by Supergrass, released as the fourth single from their debut album I Should Coco. It reached #10 in the UK Singles Chart, remaining on the chart for three weeks.

Formats and track listings
CD CDR6410
 "Lenny" (2:42)
 "Wait for the Sun" (4:09)
 "Sex!" (2:35)

Limited edition blue 7" RS6410 / TC TCR6410
 "Lenny" (2:42)
 "Wait for the Sun" (4:09)

References

1995 singles
Supergrass songs
Parlophone singles